The following outline is provided as an overview of and topical guide to Finland.

Finland – sovereign Nordic country located in Northern Europe.  Finland has borders with Sweden to the west, Russia to the east, and Norway to the north, while Estonia lies to its south across the Gulf of Finland.  The capital city is Helsinki.

Around 5.4 million people reside in Finland, with the majority concentrated in the southern part of country. It is the eighth largest country in Europe in terms of area and the most sparsely populated country in the European Union. The native language for most of the population is Finnish, a member of the Uralic language family most closely related to Estonian and one of the four EU languages not of Indo-European origin. The second official language, Swedish, is spoken by a 5.5 percent minority. Finland is a democratic, parliamentary republic with a central government and local governments in 415 municipalities. Greater Helsinki (including Helsinki, Espoo, Vantaa and Kauniainen) totals a million residents and a third of the GDP. Other major cities include Tampere, Turku, and Oulu.

Finland was historically part of Sweden and from 1809 an autonomous Grand Duchy within the Russian Empire. Finland's declaration of independence in 1917 from Russia was followed by a civil war, wars against the Soviet Union and Nazi Germany, and a period of official neutrality during the Cold War. Finland joined the United Nations in 1955 and the European Union in 1995 and participates in the Eurozone. Finland has been ranked the second most stable country in the world, in a survey based on social, economic, political, and military indicators.

Finland has seen excellent results in many international comparisons of national performance such as the share of high-technology manufacturing, the rate of gross domestic product growth, and the protection of civil liberties.

General reference

 Pronunciation: 
 Common English country name: Finland
 Official English country name: The Republic of Finland
 Common endonym(s):  Suomi
 Official endonym(s):  
 Adjectival(s): Finnish
 Demonym(s): Finns
 Etymology: Name of Finland
 International rankings of Finland
 ISO country codes: FI, FIN, 246
 ISO region codes: See ISO 3166-2:FI
 Internet country code top-level domain: .fi

Geography of Finland

Geography of Finland
 Finland is: a Nordic country
 Location:
 Northern Hemisphere and Eastern Hemisphere
 Eurasia
 Europe
 Northern Europe
 Nordic countries
 Time zone:  Eastern European Time (UTC+02), Eastern European Summer Time (UTC+03)
 Extreme points of Finland
 High:  Halti 
 Low:  Baltic Sea 0 m
 Land boundaries:  2,654 km
 1,313 km
 727 km
 614 km
 Coastline:  1,250 km
 Population of Finland: 5,356,900 (March 6, 2010)  - 112th most populous country

 Area of Finland: 338,145 km2
 Atlas of Finland

Environment of Finland

 Climate of Finland
 Environmental issues in Finland
 Renewable energy in Finland
 Geology of Finland
 Protected areas of Finland
 Biosphere reserves in Finland
 National parks of Finland
 Wildlife of Finland
 Fauna of Finland
 Birds of Finland
 Mammals of Finland

Natural geographic features of Finland
 Islands of Finland
 Lakes of Finland
 Rivers of Finland
 World Heritage Sites in Finland

Regions of Finland

Regions of Finland

Ecoregions of Finland

List of ecoregions in Finland

Administrative divisions of Finland

Administrative divisions of Finland
 Provinces of Finland
 Regions of Finland
 Sub-regions of Finland
 Municipalities of Finland

Provinces of Finland

Provinces of Finland

Regions of Finland

Regions of Finland

Sub-regions of Finland

Municipalities of Finland

Municipalities of Finland
 Capital of Finland: Helsinki
 Cities of Finland

Demography of Finland

Demographics of Finland

Government and politics of Finland

 Form of government: semi-presidential representative democratic republic
 Capital of Finland: Helsinki
 Elections in Finland
 Political parties in Finland
 Taxation in Finland

Branches of the government of Finland

Government of Finland

Executive branch of the government of Finland
 Head of state: President of Finland,
 Head of government: Prime Minister of Finland,
 Cabinet of Finland

Legislative branch of the government of Finland
 Parliament of Finland (unicameral)

Judicial branch of the government of Finland

Judicial system of Finland
 General Courts of Finland
 District Courts of Finland
 Courts of Appeals of Finland
 Supreme Court of Finland
 Administrative Courts of Finland
 Regional Administrative Courts of Finland
 Supreme Administrative Court of Finland
 Special Courts of Finland
 Market Court of Finland
 Labour Court of Finland
 Insurance Court of Finland
 High Court of Impeachment of Finland

Foreign relations of Finland

Foreign relations of Finland
 Diplomatic missions in Finland
 Diplomatic missions of Finland

International organization membership
The Republic of Finland is a member of:

 African Development Bank Group (AfDB) (nonregional member)
 Arctic Council
 Asian Development Bank (ADB) (nonregional member)
 Australia Group
 Bank for International Settlements (BIS)
 Confederation of European Paper Industries (CEPI)
 Council of Europe (CE)
 Council of the Baltic Sea States (CBSS)
 Economic and Monetary Union (EMU)
 Euro-Atlantic Partnership Council (EAPC)
 European Bank for Reconstruction and Development (EBRD)
 European Investment Bank (EIB)
 European Organization for Nuclear Research (CERN)
 European Space Agency (ESA)
 European Union (EU)
 Food and Agriculture Organization (FAO)
 Group of 9 (G9)
 Inter-American Development Bank (IADB)
 International Atomic Energy Agency (IAEA)
 International Bank for Reconstruction and Development (IBRD)
 International Chamber of Commerce (ICC)
 International Civil Aviation Organization (ICAO)
 International Criminal Court (ICCt)
 International Criminal Police Organization (Interpol)
 International Development Association (IDA)
 International Energy Agency (IEA)
 International Federation of Red Cross and Red Crescent Societies (IFRCS)
 International Finance Corporation (IFC)
 International Fund for Agricultural Development (IFAD)
 International Hydrographic Organization (IHO)
 International Labour Organization (ILO)
 International Maritime Organization (IMO)
 International Mobile Satellite Organization (IMSO)
 International Monetary Fund (IMF)
 International Olympic Committee (IOC)
 International Organization for Migration (IOM)
 International Organization for Standardization (ISO)
 International Red Cross and Red Crescent Movement (ICRM)

 International Telecommunication Union (ITU)
 International Telecommunications Satellite Organization (ITSO)
 International Trade Union Confederation (ITUC)
 Inter-Parliamentary Union (IPU)
 Multilateral Investment Guarantee Agency (MIGA)
 Nonaligned Movement (NAM) (guest)
 Nordic Council (NC)
 Nordic Investment Bank (NIB)
 Nuclear Energy Agency (NEA)
 Nuclear Suppliers Group (NSG)
 Organisation for Economic Co-operation and Development (OECD)
 Organization for Security and Cooperation in Europe (OSCE)
 Organisation for the Prohibition of Chemical Weapons (OPCW)
 Organization of American States (OAS) (observer)
 Paris Club
 Partnership for Peace (PFP)
 Permanent Court of Arbitration (PCA)
 Schengen Convention
 United Nations (UN)
 United Nations Conference on Trade and Development (UNCTAD)
 United Nations Educational, Scientific, and Cultural Organization (UNESCO)
 United Nations High Commissioner for Refugees (UNHCR)
 United Nations Industrial Development Organization (UNIDO)
 United Nations Military Observer Group in India and Pakistan (UNMOGIP)
 United Nations Mission in Liberia (UNMIL)
 United Nations Mission in the Sudan (UNMIS)
 United Nations Truce Supervision Organization (UNTSO)
 Universal Postal Union (UPU)
 Western European Union (WEU) (observer)
 World Customs Organization (WCO)
 World Federation of Trade Unions (WFTU)
 World Health Organization (WHO)
 World Intellectual Property Organization (WIPO)
 World Meteorological Organization (WMO)
 World Trade Organization (WTO)
 World Veterans Federation
 Zangger Committee (ZC)

Law and order in Finland

Law of Finland
 Capital punishment in Finland
 Constitution of Finland
 Crime in Finland
 Human rights in Finland
 LGBT rights in Finland
 Freedom of religion in Finland
 Law enforcement in Finland

Military of Finland

Military of Finland
 Command
 Commander-in-chief:
 Ministry of Defence of Finland
 Forces
 Army of Finland
 Navy of Finland
 Air Force of Finland
 Special forces of Finland
 Military history of Finland
 Military ranks of Finland

Local government in Finland

Local government in Finland

History of Finland

History of Finland

 Military history of Finland

Culture of Finland

Culture of Finland
 Architecture of Finland
 Cuisine of Finland
 Festivals in Finland
 Languages of Finland
 Media in Finland
 National symbols of Finland
 Coat of arms of Finland
 Flag of Finland
 National anthem of Finland
 People of Finland
 Sex work in Finland
 Public holidays in Finland
 Records of Finland
 Religion in Finland
 Buddhism in Finland
 Christianity in Finland
 Hinduism in Finland
 Islam in Finland
 Judaism in Finland
 Sikhism in Finland
 World Heritage Sites in Finland

Art in Finland
 Art in Finland
 Cinema of Finland
 Literature of Finland
 Music of Finland
 Television in Finland
 Theatre in Finland

Sports in Finland

Sports in Finland
 Football in Finland
Finland at the Olympics

Economy and infrastructure of Finland

Economy of Finland
 Economic rank, by nominal GDP (2007): 34th (thirty-fourth)
 Agriculture in Finland
 Banking in Finland
 National bank of Finland
 Communications in Finland
 Internet in Finland
 Companies of Finland
 Currency of Finland: Euro (see also: Euro topics)
 ISO 4217: EUR
 Energy in Finland
 Energy policy of Finland
 Oil industry in Finland
 Health care in Finland
 Mining in Finland
 Finland Stock Exchange
 Tourism in Finland
 Transport in Finland
 Airports in Finland
 Rail transport in Finland
 Roads in Finland

Education in Finland

Education in Finland
 List of schools in Finland
 List of polytechnics in Finland
 List of universities in Finland

See also

Finland

List of Finland-related topics
List of international rankings
Member state of the European Union
Member state of the United Nations
Outline of Europe
Outline of geography

References

External links

The Finnish Government – Official governmental site
The President of Finland – Official site of the President of the Republic of Finland
Parliament of Finland – Official Parliamentary site
ThisisFINLAND – Main portal to Finland (administered by the Ministry for Foreign Affairs of Finland)
Visit Finland – The official travel and tourism guide by the Finnish Tourist Board
Helsinki.fi – Capital of Finland's city portal
Today's weather by the Finnish Meteorological Institute

Finland